The 1920–21 Luxembourg National Division was the 11th season of top level association football in Luxembourg. The season was contested by eight teams, with Jeunesse Esch winning the championship. This was the first championship for Jeunesse Esch who are the most successful team in the division's history.

League standings

Results

References
Luxembourg - List of final tables (RSSSF)

Luxembourg National Division seasons
Lux
Nat